The Lake Prespa is located on the tripoint of North Macedonia, Albania, and Greece. It is a system of two lakes separated by an isthmus: the Great Prespa Lake, divided between the three countries, and the Little Prespa Lake, mostly within Greece.

The area contains three national parks: Prespa in Albania, Galičica in North Macedonia and Prespa in Greece. The largest town in the region is Resen in North Macedonia. In 2014, the Ohrid-Prespa Transboundary Reserve between Albania and North Macedonia was added to UNESCO's World Network of Biosphere Reserves.

Geography

The two lakes are separated by a 4 km (2½ miles) long and 500 metres (550 yards) wide isthmus on the Greek territory, carrying an embankment with a road connecting the village of Psarades. A short stretch of a canal connects the lakes on the western side of the isthmus.

History

In Classical times, the Prespa region formed part of ancient Lýnkos (Λύγκος), and the lakes were called Little and Great Brygeis. In the 10th century, the Tsar Samuil built the fortress and church of St. Achillius on an island called Agios Achillios in the Small Prespa Lake, on the Greek side of the border. The biggest island in the Great Prespa Lake, within North Macedonia, is called Golem Grad ("Large Town"), and Snake Island (Zmiski Ostrov). The other island Mal Grad ("Small Town", in Albania) is the site of a ruined 14th century monastery dedicated to St. Peter. Today, both islands are uninhabited.

Because Great Prespa Lake sits in limestone country about 150m above Lake Ohrid, which lies only about 10 km (6 miles) to the west, the only outlets for its waters are through underground channels in the karst and emerge from springs which feed streams running into Lake Ohrid.

For many years, the Greek part of the Prespa Lakes region was an underpopulated, military sensitive area which required special permission for outsiders to visit. It saw fierce fighting during the Greek Civil War and much of the local population subsequently emigrated to escape endemic poverty and political strife. The region remained little developed until the 1970s, when it began to be promoted as a tourist destination. With an abundance of rare fauna and flora, the area was declared a Transnational Park in 2000.  In 1999 the Society for the Protection of Prespa received the Ramsar Wetland Conservation Award for its conservation efforts regarding the Lake Prespa Ramsar site, and was eventually included on 3 July 2013.

In 2018, Great Prespa Lake was the setting for the signing of the Prespa Agreement, intended to resolve the Macedonia naming dispute by renaming the Republic of Macedonia to North Macedonia.  The agreement was signed on 17 June 2018 in a high-level ceremony at the Greek border village of Psarades on the lake, by the two foreign ministers Nikola Dimitrov (of the Republic of Macedonia) and Nikos Kotzias (of Greece) and in the presence of the respective prime ministers, Zoran Zaev and Alexis Tsipras. After the ceremony, Tsipras and Zaev crossed over the border to North Macedonia's side of the lake for lunch at the village of Oteševo, in a highly symbolic move that marked the first time a Greek prime minister ever entered the Republic of Macedonia since it declared independence in 1991.

Wildlife
Only 11 native fish species are known from the lake, but 9 of these are endemic: Alburnoides prespensis, Alburnus belvica, Barbus prespensis, Chondrostoma prespense, Cobitis meridionalis, Pelasgus prespensis, Rutilus prespensis, Salmo peristericus and Squalius prespensis; the additional two are Anguilla anguilla (European eel) and Cyprinus carpio (European carp).

Important Bird Areas
North Macedonia's part of the lake has been designated an Important Bird Area (IBA) by BirdLife International because it supports populations of ferruginous ducks, tufted ducks, Dalmatian pelicans and pygmy cormorants. The Albanian part of the lake is a separate but corresponding IBA for the same reason, as is the Greek southern section of the lake.

Tourism
Lake Prespa in North Macedonia has not commanded a large tourism population in the past. The majority of foreign tourism has been clustered around the sister lake, Ohrid, where there are abundant overnight accommodations, restaurants and a lively town center in the summer months. Lake Prespa has subsequently remained somewhat isolated and pastoral, bringing its own special attraction in current times. The area remains pristine, without the hustle and bustle of a tourist town and a distinct lack of concrete and pollution which usually comes with developing tourism. Waterfront developments with sophisticated cafes serving food and drinks such as "Connect Beach" in the village of Slivnica, however, are providing a way for visitors to spend the day on the lake in luxury, without impacting on the environment. Companies such Prespa Panorama based in North Macedonia are leading the development of overnight lodging for the region with a concept of low environmental impact, low volume accommodations in the region. The municipality of Resen has begun construction of a paved walking and biking path that will link the individual villages providing access for a walking or biking tour of the numerous villages that are scattered around the lake. The completed concept will allow individuals to explore the entire south western corner of North Macedonia including Pelister and Galicica, two of the most beautiful and scenic mountain peaks of the region on foot or by bicycle. A descent from Galicica on the western face brings the cyclist or hiker down to the most scenic part of Lake Ohrid, which is separated from Lake Prespa by its massif. Once on the Lake Ohrid side, the springs where the waters of Lake Prespa emerge from under the mountain and drain into Lake Ohrid can be enjoyed.

Gallery

Sources
 "Prespa, Lake". Encyclopædia Britannica, 2005.
 "Prespa, Lake". The Columbia Encyclopedia, 2004.

See also
Prespa National Park
Prespa, adjacent region in North Macedonia
Prespes, adjacent municipality in Greece
Prespa e Vogël and Golloborda, adjacent region in Albania

References

External links

 Archived webpage of Transboundary Prespa Park
Archived webpage of Prespa National Park Official Website

Ancient lakes
Prespa
Prespa
Prespa
Prespa National Park (Albania)
National parks of Greece 
Resen Municipality
Albania–North Macedonia border
Albania–Greece border
Greece–North Macedonia border
Prespa
Border tripoints
Protected areas established in 2000
Ramsar sites in Albania
Ramsar sites in North Macedonia
Landforms of Western Macedonia
Tourist attractions in Western Macedonia
Important Bird Areas of North Macedonia
Important Bird Areas of Greece
Important Bird Areas of Albania
Endorheic lakes of Europe